"All in My Head" is a song by British electronic music group Kosheen. It was released as a single on 28 July 2003 in the United Kingdom. The single peaked at number seven on the UK Singles Chart and reached the top 40 in Australia, Ireland, and Italy.

Track listings
UK CD1
 "All in My Head" (radio edit) – 4:08
 "All in My Head" (Planet Funk remix) – 6:01
 "All in My Head" (Decoder & Substance remix) – 8:32

UK CD2
 "All in My Head" (radio edit) – 4:08
 "(Slip and Slide) Suicide" (Kosheen Head mix) – 3:39
 "Hide U" (Decoder & Substance mix) – 4:52

UK 12-inch single
A. "All in My Head" (Planet Funk mix) – 10:46
B. "All in My Head" (Decoder & Substance mix) – 8:32

European CD single
 "All in My Head" (radio edit) – 4:08
 "All in My Head" (Planet Funk remix) – 10:31

Australian CD single
 "All in My Head" (radio edit) – 4:08
 "All in My Head" (Planet Funk remix edit) – 6:01
 "All in My Head" (Decoder & Substance mix 2) – 8:32
 "(Slip and Slide) Suicide" (Kosheen Head mix) – 3:39

Charts

Weekly charts

Year-end charts

References

2003 singles
2003 songs
Arista Records singles
Bertelsmann Music Group singles
Kosheen songs